Grant Farrell (born 29 January 2000) is a United States Virgin Islands international soccer player who plays as a defender.

Career statistics

International

References

External links
 Grant Farrell at the Truett McConnell University

2000 births
Living people
United States Virgin Islands soccer players
United States Virgin Islands international soccer players
Association football defenders
Truett McConnell Bears men's soccer players